Damias leptosema is a moth of the family Erebidae first described by Alfred Jefferis Turner in 1940. It is found in Australia.

References

Damias
Moths described in 1940